Tarasa may refer to:
 Tarasa (plant), a genus of flowering plants in the family Malvaceae
 Tarasa (village), a village in Bokhansky District, Russia
 Tarasa (river), a river in Irkutsk Oblast, Russia